Alma Lilia Luna Munguía (born 6 August 1976) is a Mexican politician affiliated with the Institutional Revolutionary Party. She serves as a federal deputy to the LXIII Legislature of the Mexican Congress representing the XXXII Federal Electoral District of the State of Mexico, centered on Valle de Chalco Solidaridad.

Life
As she pursued a law degree, Luna began her political career in the municipality of Valle de Chalco; she was a municipal technical secretary from 1997 to 1998 and worker her way up to various positions in the municipality, most recently, she was municipal secretary of Valle de Chalco from 2009 to 2012.

Her political career was marked by two party flips. She started in the PRI, participating in its campaigns for governor and municipal president. However, by 2003, she had flipped to the Party of the Democratic Revolution, and it was during her time in the PRD that she went to San Lázaro for the first time, as a deputy in the LX Legislature of the Mexican Congress. She was a secretary on the National Defense Commission and sat on others dealing with Hydraulic Resources, Transportation and Special on Non-Discrimination.

After her first term, Luna flipped back to the PRI, becoming a municipal political councilor in that party between 2009 and 2015. She also served as a coordinator in Valle de Chalco for the PRI's 2011 gubernatorial and 2012 presidential campaigns.

In 2015, voters in the 32nd district, centered on Valle de Chalco, returned Luna to the Chamber of Deputies for the LXIII Legislature. She serves on the Cooperative Stimulus and Social Economy, Culture and Film, and Human Rights Commissions.

Personal
Alma's brother, Miguel Ángel Luna Munguía, also represented Chalco in the Chamber of Deputies, for the LXI Legislature under the PRI banner. He was running against Alma as the PRD candidate when he was killed in his campaign office on 2 June 2015, just days before the election.

References

1976 births
Living people
Politicians from the State of Mexico
Women members of the Chamber of Deputies (Mexico)
Members of the Chamber of Deputies (Mexico) for the State of Mexico
Party of the Democratic Revolution politicians
Institutional Revolutionary Party politicians
21st-century Mexican politicians
21st-century Mexican women politicians
Deputies of the LXIII Legislature of Mexico